Tiburón Island is the largest island in the Gulf of California and the largest island in Mexico, with an area of . It was made a nature reserve in 1963 by President Adolfo López Mateos.

Etymology
 is Spanish for 'shark'. Although the Seri name, was first recorded by Alphonse Pinart in 1879, its etymology is unknown.

Geography
Tiburón Island is part of the Mexican state of Sonora, as well as the Hermosillo Municipality, and is located at approximately the same latitude as the city of Hermosillo. It is located along the eastern shore of the Gulf of California, opposite Isla Ángel de la Guarda. It is part of the chain of islands known as the Midriff Islands or Islas Grandes.

The island has a prominent mountain system of volcanic origin.

History
Tiburón Island is part of the traditional homeland of some bands (or clans) of the Seri people, for many centuries if not millennia. During the 1960s and early 1970s, a small hunting and fishing camp on the northern end of the island was operated by Jesus Olivas, a resident of Hermosillo. He constructed several buildings, a dock and an airstrip near the historic Seri encampment at Tecomate. The camp was popular with American visitors to the area. The remains of the structures and airstrip are still in place (although the airstrip was rendered unusable by the Mexican military around 1995 in an attempt to keep it from being used by smugglers active in the area at the time). The Mexican government, through a decree by President Echeverría, gave the Seri "recognition and title of communal property" with respect to Tiburón Island in 1975.

The island is uninhabited (except for Mexican military encampments on the eastern and southern shores of the island) and is administered as an ecological preserve by the Seri tribal government in conjunction with the federal government. Bighorn sheep were introduced to the island in the 1980s; hunting is managed by the tribal government in coordination with Mexican federal authorities. It is also home to a unique subspecies of coyote (Canis latrans jamesi) and mule deer (Odocoileus hemionus sheldoni) that are endemic to the island.

Transportation
The island can be reached from Punta Chueca, which is the nearest community inhabited by members of the Seri tribe, and from Bahía de Kino, a non-Seri community  to the south. The channel between the mainland and the island is called  ('Tiny Hell's Channel') because of the strong tidal currents and shoal water that occur there which can make navigation challenging.

Recreation
Two permits are required for day hiking and overnight stays on the island: one from the Seri Governor's office in Punta Chueca and another from the ISLAS office in Bahía de Kino.

In popular culture
In 2012, two television episodes of Survivorman were filmed on Tiburón Island, featuring Les Stroud as he spends ten days living on the island. Mermaids of Tiburon is a 1962 film about a diver looking for buried treasure who comes across mermaids.

See also

 Tiburón Island Tragedy

Notes

External link

 
Hermosillo
Islands of Sonora
Natural history of Sonora
Islands of the Gulf of California
Nature reserves in Mexico
Protected areas of Sonora
Uninhabited islands of Mexico